Into the Light is an alien invasion science fiction novel by David Weber and Chris Kennedy released by Tor Books on January 12, 2021. It is the continuation of Weber's earlier book, Out of the Dark.

Plot 
On a devastated Earth, salvaged Shongairi technology sets humanity up to recover and advance beyond the tragedy of alien invasion, soon to be united under the banner of the newly formed Planetary Union. As the leap in technology and scientific knowledge sets humanity up for a bright interstellar future, Dave Dvorak starts looking among the stars for allies in the coming confrontation with the Galactic Hegemony.

At the same time, Vlad Dracuela and Stephen Buchevsky lead the captured and now vampire-crewed Shongairi fleet on its journey to enemy space.

Main characters

Humans 
 Dave Dvorak: The owner of an indoor shooting range and one of the leaders of the new U.S. government
 Rob Wilson: A former U.S. Marine sergeant and Dvorak's brother in law
 President Howell: The President of the United States

Vampires 
 Vlad Dracuela (a.k.a. Mircea Basarab): A Romanian vampire with a long and mysterious past.
 Major Dan "Longbow" Torino: A former U.S. Air Force pilot turned Vampire leader
 Stephen Buchevsky: A former U.S. Marine and Vlad's first lieutenant

Reception 
This book was reviewed by the Wall Street Journal and Publishers Weekly.

References

External links

2021 American novels
Alien invasions in novels
American science fiction novels
2021 science fiction novels
Novels by David Weber
Tor Books books
American vampire novels